Niall Edward Morris (born 8 August 1988) is a former Irish rugby union footballer who played wing or fullback for Leicester Tigers in the English Premiership.

Morris played for Leinster Rugby on a development contract, appearing for the first team eight times.

He joined Leicester in the summer of 2011. While at Leicester he started the 2013 Premiership final and scored a try as they defeated Northampton Saints. It was revealed by Leicester Tigers, that Morris was out of contract at the end of the 2015/2016 season, and wasn't being offered a new one.

In September 2013 Morris was called up for a training camp with the senior Ireland squad.

References

External links 
 ESPN Scrum profile
 Statbunker profile
 IRB junior world championship profile

1988 births
Living people
Rugby union wings
Irish rugby union players
Leicester Tigers players
People educated at Blackrock College
Rugby union players from Dublin (city)
Leinster Rugby players
Irish expatriate rugby union players
Irish expatriate sportspeople in England